Trevor Raymond Morris (born 1956) is a former Australian international lawn bowler.

Bowls career
He won a gold medal in the pairs with Ian Schuback at the 1990 Commonwealth Games in Auckland.

He won two medals at the Asia Pacific Bowls Championships including a gold medal in the 1987 triples, in Lae, Papua New Guinea. In 1989, he won the Hong Kong International Bowls Classic pairs title.

References

Australian male bowls players
1956 births
Living people
Commonwealth Games medallists in lawn bowls
Commonwealth Games gold medallists for Australia
Bowls players at the 1990 Commonwealth Games
20th-century Australian people
Medallists at the 1990 Commonwealth Games